Annandale (Gaelic: Srath Anann) is a strath in Dumfries and Galloway, Scotland, named after the dale of the River Annan. It runs north–south through the Southern Uplands from Annanhead (north of Moffat) to Annan on the Solway Firth, and in its higher reaches it separates the Moffat hills on the east from the Lowther hills to the west.

History
Annandale was also an historic district of Scotland, bordering Liddesdale to the east, Nithsdale to the west, Clydesdale and Tweeddale to the north and the Solway Firth to the south. The district which was in the Sheriffdom of Dumfries and later became part of the County of Dumfries, one of the counties of Scotland. The main reorganisation took place during the Local Government (Scotland) Act 1889, which established a uniform system of county councils and town councils in Scotland and restructured many of Scotland's counties. (See: History of local government in the United Kingdom). It is one of three subdivisions of Dumfriesshire, along with Eskdale (previously part of Liddesdale) and Nithsdale.

It is famous for its connection with Ben Johnson and Robert the Bruce, as the de Brus family was given this land by David I in 1124, as one of the border lordships when David became Prince of the Cumbrians. Along with Carrick, these lands acted as a buffer between the quasi-independent Lordship or Kingdom of Galloway and David's lands of Strathclyde and Cumbria.

See also
Annandale distillery
Annadale, Shimla

References

External links
Historic map showing Annandale, Eusdale/Eskdale and Liddesdale
Historic map of the divisions of Scotland
Historic map of the divisions of Scotland
Historic map of the divisions of Scotland

Annandale and Eskdale